SuGui Kriss (birth name Yang SuGui; born July 6, 1987) is a former American Paralympic volleyballer.

Biography
Kriss was born in Kunming, Yunnan province, China from where she was adopted when she was 8 years old. She started competing for Paralympic Games in 2006, when she got into the 5th place at Netherlands' Sitting Volleyball World Championship.

In 2007, she got her first medal which was silver for her participation at Sitting volleyball Invitational in Shanghai, China. The same year she visited her orphanage for a month and a half. She came back to her homeland for the 2008 Paralympics which were held in Beijing, during which she first carried an American flag and won a silver medal.

The same year she got a bronze medal for her participation at World Organization Volleyball for Disabled at Ismaïlia, Egypt.

References

External links
 
 
 

Chinese emigrants to the United States
Paralympic volleyball players of the United States
Paralympic silver medalists for the United States
Living people
1987 births
Volleyball players at the 2008 Summer Paralympics
Medalists at the 2008 Summer Paralympics
American sportswomen
American sportspeople of Chinese descent
American sitting volleyball players
Women's sitting volleyball players
Sportspeople from Kunming
American adoptees
Chinese adoptees
Paralympic medalists in volleyball
21st-century American women